The 2002 Nicholls State Colonels football team represented Nicholls State University as a member of the Southland Football League during the 2002 NCAA Division I-AA football season. Led by fourth-year head Daryl Daye, the Colonels compiled an overall record of 7–4 with a mark of 3–3 in conference play, tying for third place in the Southland. Nicholls State played home games at John L. Guidry Stadium in Thibodaux, Louisiana.

Schedule

References

Nicholls State
Nicholls Colonels football seasons
Nicholls State Colonels football